KFF Vizioni is a women's football club based in Ferizaj, Kosovo. The club competes in Kosovo Women's Football League which is the top tier of women's football in the country. Their home ground is the Ismet Shabani Stadium which has a seating capacity of 500.

See also
 List of football clubs in Kosovo

References

Football clubs in Kosovo
Women's football clubs in Kosovo